Christ for the Nations Institute (CFNI) is the educational arm of the ministry Christ for the Nations, Inc. Founded by Gordon and Freda Lindsay in July 1970. CFNI is an interdenominational charismatic Bible college located in Dallas, Texas.

History
American evangelist Gordon Lindsay and his wife, Freda Lindsay, founded Christ for the Nations Institute (CFNI) in 1970. After Gordon's passing in 1973, Mrs. Lindsay and her family continued operating the institution. The organization has trained more than 33,000 students, reached 120 nations, and assisted native congregations in building more than 12,500 churches all over the world.

Accreditation and affiliation
CFNI is accredited by the International Christian Accrediting Association, a private Christian organization operated under the auspices of Oral Roberts University.

CFNI is a member of the Association of Christian Schools International, is approved by the United States Department of Homeland Security to enroll international students, and has approval from the Department of Veterans Affairs for veteran training.

Christ for the Nations Institute is not state accredited. Until April 21, 2007, it had "applicant status" with the Association for Biblical Higher Education. Applicant status is a pre-membership status granted to colleges that may be able to achieve pre-accreditation candidate status within four years. On April 21, 2007, the board of directors of Christ for the Nations decided to withdraw from pursuing ABHE accreditation. However, CFNI holds articulation agreements, for the purpose of transferring credits, with many accredited Christian universities and Bible colleges. The receiving school always determines credit transferability. Some of these institutions include, Ecclesia College, Southwestern Assemblies of God University, Dallas Baptist University, The King's University, Oral Roberts University, and Regent University.

Athletics
Christ for the Nations Institute has a number of intramural sports teams, some of which include: flag football, basketball, volleyball and soccer.

CFNI Association of Bible Schools (CFNABS)

Below is a list of ninety-two schools in forty-seven nations within the Association

Africa
 Botswana: Love Botswana Bible Institute
 Cameroon
 Cameroon Bible College
 Fire Bible Institute
 Christ For Africa University
 Congo/Burundi 
 Missions Training Center – CFNI
 Ethiopia: Christ for the Nations Ethiopia
 Ghana: Christian Faith Training Center
 Ivory Coast
 Institut International de Formation Pastoral et Théologique
 Ivory Coast Burning Bush Biblical Institute
 Kenya
 Biblical Life Bible College
 Glory Bible School
 Lari Hills Theological School
Nurmay Missionary Training and Empowerment Center
 Liberia
 Christ for the Nations Bible School
 Christ Our Savior Bible School
 Promised Land Equipping Center
 Malawi: Grace Bible Institute
 Mauritius: Word 2 Change
 Mozambique
 Inhaminga Afrika wa Yesu Bible School
 Nacala Afrika wa Yesu Bible School
Nigeria
 Christ for the Nations Jos
 Apostle Geoffrey Dabibi Numbere Bible College
 Reuben George Theological Seminary 
 Senegal: Word Alive Bible Training Center
 South Africa
 Durban Christian Centre Bible School
 Light For Africa Bible School
 New Covenant Church Bryanston Bible School
 Revealed Word Bible College
 Word of Faith Bible Institute
 Zimbabwe
 Celebration College -
 Faith World Bible College – Harare 
 Goshen International Bible College – Harare
 Hope Bible College – Harare

Asia
 India
 Bible Training Institute – Allahabad
 Carmel Bible College – Eluru
 Christ for the Nations Bible College – Nagaland
 Christ for the Nations Punjab
 Doulos Bible Institute – Shillong
 Good News For Asia Bible College – Kerala
 Maranatha Theological Seminary
 Maranatha Biblical Seminary – Vijayawada
 Maranatha Veda Patasala – Visakhapatnam
 Middle East: Christ International Embassy Bible Institute
 Nepal: Kathmandu International University
 Japan: Christ for the Nations Japan (Sapporo)
 Myanmar
 Myanmar Bible Seminary
 Shiloh Bible College
 Pakistan: Kingdom Bible College
 South Korea: Christ for the Nations Korea (Seoul)
 Sri Lanka
 Harvest Leadership Institute
 Lanka Bible College and Seminary
 LBC Graduate School
 Thailand: Next Institute of Ministry

Caribbean and North America
 Christ for the Nations Haiti (Port-au-Prince)
 Jamaica: Emmanuel Caribbean University (Montego Bay)
 Mexico
 Cristo Para Las Naciones (Ecatepec)
 Cristo Para Las Naciones de Mexico (Mexico City)
 Cristo Para Las Naciones (Monterrey)
 Cristo Para Las Naciones (Querétaro)
 Estandarte Para Las Naciones (Puebla)
 Christ for the Nations Coyoacon-Naucalpan-Cuajimalpa
 Christ for the Nations Oaxaca-Tamazulapan
 Christ for the Nations (Nezahualcoytl)
 Christ for the Nations (Texcoco)
 International Harvesters Institute (Nuevo Laredo)
 Universidad Palabra De Vida (Jalisco)

Central America
 Belize: Christ for the Nations Belize
 Costa Rica: CFNI, Costa Rica
 El Salvador: CFNI, El Salvador, Centro America
 Guatemala: CFNI, Guatemala
 Honduras
 CFNI, San Pedro Sula
 CFNI, Tegucigalpa
 Nicaragua: CFNI, Nicaragua

Europe
 Albania: Christ for the Nations Albania
 Belarus: Christ for the Nations
 Denmark: Christ For Denmark
 Germany: Christ for the Nations Glaubenszentrum
 Netherlands: Christ for the Nations
 Poland: Christ for the Nations Poland
 Romania
 Christ for Romania Cluj (Şcoala Biblică "Cristos pentru România")
 Christ for Romania Suceava
 Christ for Romania Timișoara

Oceania
 Australia: Christ for the Nations Australia

South America
 Brazil
 Instituto Cristo Para as Nações Brazil 
 Instituto Cristo Para as Nações Fortaueza 
 Instituto Cristo Para as Nações Rio de Janeiro
 Instituto Cristo Para as Nações Manaus
 School of Leaders for the International Restoration Ministry 
 Colombia: Cristo Para Las Naciones Colombia
 Ecuador
 Escuela de Reyes CFNI
 Instituto Cristo para las Naciones Ecuador
 Peru: El Centro de Entrenamiento Ministerial y Musical (NISI)

Youth for the Nations
Christ for the Nations Institute hosts an annual youth camp, called Youth for the Nations (YFN) for a few weeks during the summer. Since 1990, thousands of young people have attended the event in Dallas, Texas.

See also
 School accreditation

References

External links
 

Seminaries and theological colleges in Texas
Universities and colleges in Dallas
Unaccredited Christian universities and colleges in the United States
Bible colleges
Educational institutions established in 1970